Romano Garagnani (6 June 1937 – 30 January 1999) was an Italian skeet shooter. He competed at the 1968, 1976, 1980 and 1984 Olympics and won a silver medal in 1968. Garagnani also won bronze medals at the 1969 and 1978 world championships and a European title in 1977, as well as two medals at the Mediterranean Games (1971 and 1975) and five Italian titles. In 1980, before the Moscow Olympics he shot 200 out of 200 in a local competition, but finished only 28th at the Olympics.

References

External links
 

1937 births
1999 deaths
Italian male sport shooters
Shooters at the 1968 Summer Olympics
Shooters at the 1972 Summer Olympics
Shooters at the 1976 Summer Olympics
Shooters at the 1980 Summer Olympics
Olympic shooters of Italy
Olympic silver medalists for Italy
Olympic medalists in shooting
Medalists at the 1968 Summer Olympics
Mediterranean Games gold medalists for Italy
Mediterranean Games bronze medalists for Italy
Competitors at the 1971 Mediterranean Games
Competitors at the 1975 Mediterranean Games
Mediterranean Games medalists in shooting
20th-century Italian people